Saint Roderick is a c.1650-1655 oil on canvas painting of Saint Roderick by Murillo, now in the Gemaldegalerie Alte Meister in Dresden. He is shown vested as a priest in a chasuble (with a central motif of Saint Andrew and Saint Peter) and a maniple and holding a biretta and a martyr's palm.

References

1650s paintings
Paintings by Bartolomé Esteban Murillo
Collections of the Gemäldegalerie Alte Meister
Angels in art
Paintings of saints
Paintings of apostles
Paintings depicting Andrew the Apostle
Paintings depicting Saint Peter